Zagreb school may refer to:
 School of Medicine, University of Zagreb
 Zagreb Philological School, 19th-century philological school that operated in Zagreb
 Zagreb School of Animated Films
 Zagreb School of Economics and Management